Comedy Central is a Dutch pay television channel based on the American channel of the same name. The channel is available on cable, digital terrestrial, IPTV, and satellite operators in the Netherlands. It broadcasts many imports as well as original programming.

History

The Box (1995-2006)
The Box was originally a Dutch music channel, which allowed viewers to vote on music videos. It launched in June 1995 and was founded by a joint venture between Video Jukebox Network and Quote Media. The Box was taken over by the German music television network  VIVA Media in 2002. In June 2004, The Box was acquired by MTV Networks Benelux of Viacom. On 1 December 2006 The Box's airtime was shortened, coinciding with Nickelodeon's move from the channel Talpa (now RTL 8) to The Box channel. The Box was replaced by The Box Comedy with only a program block of The Box during the night.

The Box Comedy (2006-2007)

The Box Comedy was a temporary television channel that was launched in the Netherlands on 1 December 2006. It replaced the music video channel The Box, which used to broadcast music 24 hours a day and the playlist was composed by televoting.  It was intended to ease the transition from The Box to Comedy Central. The Box Comedy broadcast shows like SpongeBob SquarePants, Avatar: The Last Airbender, Wayside and My Life As A Teenage Robot. It time-shared with Nickelodeon. Nickelodeon broadcasting in daytime and The Box Comedy in the evenings.

During the night the channel continued to broadcast R&B music under the name The Box. On 30 April 2007, the transition was completed when Comedy Central took control of its airtime.

Comedy Central
Comedy Central launched on 30 April 2007, replacing former channel The Box Comedy. Between 2007 and 2010 Comedy Central aired between 8:00 pm and 5:00 am. The programming began after the programming of Nickelodeon.

In October 2008 Comedy Central launched a 24-hour digital sister channel, Comedy Central Family, a close collaboration between MTV Networks and Endemol. The channel was first offered by cable operator Ziggo. After this, other providers followed gradually.

On 4 November 2010 it was announced that Comedy Central would receive more airtime. Comedy Central ceased timesharing with Nickelodeon on 1 January 2011, when Comedy Central moved to the TMF channel. On that channel Comedy Central is broadcasting 15 hours a day, between 15:00 and 06:00 (CET). It replaced TMF in its entirety in 2011. During mornings and early afternoons Kindernet was broadcast between 06:00 and 15:00 (CET).

From 1 October 2012 until 31 October 2013, Comedy Central is broadcasting 21 hours a day, between 09:00 and 06:00 (CET). In the early morning hours Kindernet was broadcast on the same channel between 06:00 and 09:00 (CET).

As of 3 April 2012 Comedy Central is also available in HD.

Since 1 November 2013, Comedy Central is broadcasting 24 hours a day, replacing Kindernet between 06:00 and 09:00 (CET).

From November 2011 the digital channel Comedy Central Extra is broadcast by cable company Ziggo. These broadcasts include the American satirical program The Daily Show and stand-up shows. On 10 November 2022, it was announced that Comedy Central Extra would close in the Netherlands on 31 December 2022.

On 1 October 2011, Comedy Central underwent a rebranding for the new logo. In 2012 the channel started with HD broadcasts, beginning on April 3, 2012, at UPC and from 2 July 2012 at Ziggo. It is broadcast increasingly in native HD on Comedy Central.

The voice-over since the launch of the channel in 2007 and since the rebrand in 2011 is provided by Joost Griffioen.

Comedy Central Family closed on 31 May 2018. However, some of its programmes moved to Comedy Central Extra.

On 2 April 2019, Comedy Central underwent a rebranding for the new logo in Comedy Sans 2018-2019 Era.

Productions 
Own Productions:
Comedy Central News
Doll
Freeks Oudejaars
HiHaHondenlul
Joezjny
Lesboos
The Daily Show, Nederlandse Editie
New Kids

From Belgium:
Kabouter Wesley

From Japan:
Takeshi's Castle

From the United States:
30 Rock
3rd Rock from the Sun
8 Simple Rules
Aliens
American Dad!
Archer
Becker
Better off Ted
Bless the Harts
Bob's Burgers
Bored to Death
Californication
Call Me Fitz
Chuck
Community
Dickie Roberts: Forever Child Star
Eastbound & Down
Entourage
Family Guy
Friends
Frasier
Futurama
Grounded for Life
How I Met Your Mother
Hung
It's Always Sunny In Philadelphia
Kevin of the North
Malcolm in the Middle
My Name Is Earl
Psych
Punch-Drunk Love
Rick and Morty
Scrubs
South Park
Stand Up Saturday
That '70s Show
The Best of Saturday Night Live
The Cleveland Show
The Jeff Dunham Show
Married... with Children
The Middle
The Office US
The Roast Of...
The Simpsons
Tosh.0
Yes Dear
Young & Hungry

From the United Kingdom:
Free Agents
Takeshi's Castle (British edited version and Dutch commentary)
Taking the Flak
The Graham Norton Show'''The IT CrowdTwo Pints of Lager and a Packet of Crisps''

See also
Comedy Central

References

External links 
 Comedy Central Netherlands

Comedy Central
Television channels and stations established in 2007
Television channels in the Netherlands